"Mama" is a song by British DJ and record producer Jonas Blue, featuring vocals from Australian singer William Singe. It was released by Jonas Blue Music on 5 May 2017 as the fourth single from Blue's album, Blue. "Mama" was written by Ed Drewett, Romans and Blue, who also produced the song. The song was highly successful, reaching the top 10 in at least 20 countries.

Background
Regarding the song, Blue said "'Mama' is a song about that period of your life when you're young and carefree, without stress, bills and problems and all you care about is having a good time with your friends every day and night!" The video had in appearance, Albanian model, Oriola Marashi.

Track listing

Charts

Weekly charts

Year-end charts

Certifications

Release history

References

2017 songs
2017 singles
Jonas Blue songs
Dutch Top 40 number-one singles
Songs about mothers
Songs written by Ed Drewett
Songs written by Jonas Blue
Songs written by Romans (musician)
Tropical house songs
William Singe songs